Vattnet, formerly known as Vattnet Viskar, was an American post-metal band from New Hampshire that have released three albums and a self-titled EP.

History
Formed in Plaistow, New Hampshire in 2010, their name is Swedish for “the water is whispering”.

On June 16, 2015, Vattnet Viskar released their sophomore album titled Settler which was largely inspired by the Space Shuttle Challenger Disaster and Christa McAuliffe in particular. Guitarist Chris Alfieri stated in a June 17, 2015, interview with Decibel Magazine that, "Christa was from Concord, New Hampshire, the town that I live in. One of my first memories is the Challenger mission's demise, so it's a personal thing for me. But the album isn't about the explosion, it's about everything else. Pushing to become something else, something better. A transformation, and touching the divine." The group released a third LP "Vattnet" on September 15, 2017.

On February 22, 2018, Chris Alfieri announced the band had broken up.

Discography

Studio albums
 Sky Swallower (2013, Century Media Records)
 Settler (2015, Century Media Records)
 Vattnet (2017, New Damage Records)

EPs
 Vattnet Viskar (2012, Broken Limb Recordings)

Demo
 Demo (2011, self-released)

References

American black metal musical groups
Blackgaze musical groups
American post-metal musical groups
2010 establishments in New Hampshire
Heavy metal musical groups from New Hampshire
Musical groups established in 2010
Musical groups disestablished in 2018